Zoila Lourdes Carmen Sandra Mendoza del Solar (born 7 January 1958) is a Peruvian businesswoman and politician with the Peruvian Aprista Party. She is the first woman in Peru's history to become a Vice President of Peru, running as the Second Running mate of Alan García in the 2006 election.

She was also elected as Member of Congress representing Arequipa, where she had been elected as "regidora" in 2002. She served until the 2011 election when she lost her seat in the 2011 elections when she ran for re-election.

References

1958 births
Living people
Vice presidents of Peru
American Popular Revolutionary Alliance politicians
Members of the Congress of the Republic of Peru
Peruvian women in business
Women vice presidents
21st-century Peruvian women politicians
21st-century Peruvian politicians
Women members of the Congress of the Republic of Peru